Pinakini Satyagraha Aasramam is also called Gandhi Aasramam, it was started by Mahatma Gandhi in 1921 in Pallipadu Village, Indukurpet mandal, Nellore district, Andhra Pradesh state, India. 

Schools in Nellore district
1921 establishments in India